The Trump Group, based in Aventura, Florida, is a developer of luxury condominiums and investor in private companies; it is not related to the  Trump Organization, owned by Donald Trump. Its projects  include Williams Island in Aventura, Estates at Acqualina, and Luxuria in Boca Raton.

History
The company was founded by Jules and Eddie Trump (who are not related to Donald Trump), Jewish brothers who moved to the United States from South Africa in the 1970s. In 1980, the brothers began their first project, Williams Island in Aventura.

Initially based in New York, the company purchased the Seattle-based Pay 'n Save drug store chain in 1984. Shortly after its purchase of Pay 'n Save, after a magazine incorrectly ascribed the purchase to Donald Trump, the company was unsuccessfully sued by the Trump Organization over the use of the Trump name; however, The Trump Group's trademark was revoked in 1988.

References

Privately held companies based in Florida
Real estate companies of the United States
Investment companies of the United States